Lindian is a county of roughly 10,000 inhabitants under the jurisdiction of Daqing, Heilongjiang province, China. Lindian County is divided into five towns and three townships, among which, the town of Lindian serves as the political and transportation centre of the county.

Geographically, Lindian county is located form 124°18'E to 125°21'E and 46°44'N to 47°29'N with a total area of 3746 square kilometers including 1160 square kilometers cultivated land.

The county has a total and agricultural population of 260,000 and 198,000, respectively. Ninety nine percent of the total population is Han people and peoples of eleven other ethnic groups such as Mongolian, Hui, Manchu and Korean are living mixed with them. The natural growth rate of its population is below 0.41 percent.

Lying on the alluvial plain of Songhua-Nen rivers and with the Wuyuer River and Shuangyang River flowing across its land, Lindian County possesses 210 square kilometers of water surface and 2100 square kilometers of wetland. It covers part of Zhalong Nature Reserve, which is listed in the World Important Wetland Contents in 1992 by the United Nations, and also owns Xiaoheishan Natural Reserve. In the reserve regions are dwelling 13 different types of cranes including the rare red-crowned crane and 181 other water birds such as swans, wild goose, white storks and mandarin ducks.

Lindian is establishing its name for its rich geothermal resources. Beneath the entire country territory stores 180,000 million cubic meters of heat water with temperature ranging from forty degrees Celsius to ninety degrees Celsius. It is named the Town of Hot Springs of China in September 2004 by China Mining Association.

The County also enjoys a good public infrastructure. There are national highways, independent electrical supplies, fiber and cable networks, and financial and commercial services among other facilities.

As for the Town of Lindian, the total area is 148 square kilometers and the total population is 52,378 (see the note below).

Administrative divisions 
Lindian County is divided into 5 towns and 3 townships. 
5 towns
 Lindian, Hongqi, Huayuan, Sijiqing, Heminghu
3 townships
 Dongxing, Hongwei, Sihe

Climate

References

The source of the facts mentioned above is the official website of Lindian County , except for the total population of the Town of Lindian, which is sourced from the Fifth National Census on Chinese Population taken in 2000 and is supposed to be smaller than present figures.

External links
Official website of Lindian County

 
County level divisions of Heilongjiang
Daqing